Adinobotrys is a genus of flowering plant in the family Fabaceae, native to from Indo-China to western Malesia. The genus was first described in 1911.

Description
Adinobotrys species are evergreen trees, compared to related genera which are lianas. The standards of its papilionaceous flowers are glabrous (hairless), and the wing petals more or else equal in length to the keel.

Taxonomy
The genus Adinobotrys was first described by Stephen Troyte Dunn in 1911. In 1994, most of the species then placed in Adinobotrys were sunk into Callerya by Anne M. Schot (the remaining species was placed in Afgekia). A molecular phylogenetic study in 2019 showed that Adinobotrys was not closely related to Callerya, and resurrected the genus, initially with two species. The study suggested the relationships, to the level of genera, were as in the following cladogram:

Two further species were added to Adinobotrys in 2020.

Species
, Plants of the World Online accepted four species:
Adinobotrys atropurpureus (Wall.) Dunn
Adinobotrys katinganensis (Adema) J.Compton & Schrire
Adinobotrys sarawakensis (Adema) J.Compton & Schrire
Adinobotrys vastus (Kosterm.) J.Compton & Schrire

References 

Faboideae
Fabaceae genera